Erythraean or Erythraian may refer to:
Eritrea
Erythraean Sibyl, the prophetess of classical antiquity presiding over the Apollonian oracle at Erythrae, a town in Ionia
Erythraean Sea, the name in ancient cartography for a body of water located between the Horn of Africa and the Arabian Peninsula, now identified as the Gulf of Aden

See also 
 
 
 Erythraea (disambiguation)